Edward Montgomery Jordan (born January 29, 1955) is an American former professional basketball player and coach. He formerly served as head coach of the Philadelphia 76ers, Washington Wizards, and Sacramento Kings in the National Basketball Association (NBA). He was also head coach for three seasons at Rutgers University.

Basketball career

College career
Jordan attended Rutgers University from 1973 to 1977. He was enrolled as a physical education student, but failed to graduate. Jordan helped lead the school to the 1976 NCAA Final Four, during which he was named East Regional MVP. At Rutgers, Jordan acquired the nickname "Fast Eddie."  In his senior season, Jordan was named honorable mention All-America, while setting Rutgers' all-time career records in assists (585) and steals (220).

NBA career

Early NBA career
Jordan was selected by the Cleveland Cavaliers in the second round of the 1977 NBA draft (33rd overall), and was acquired by the New Jersey Nets halfway through his rookie season. Jordan tied Norm Nixon (Los Angeles Lakers) for the lead in total steals with 201 in 1978–1979, and was second in total steals, 223, in 1979–80 (behind the New York Knicks' Micheal Ray Richardson with 265).

Later NBA career
Jordan played for the Los Angeles Lakers during the 1980–81 season, and was a member of the 1982 NBA World Championship team. He played for the Lakers for four years and then played briefly with the Portland Trail Blazers. Jordan retired from the NBA after the 1983–84 season. Over his seven-year NBA career, Jordan averaged 8.1 points, 3.8 assists and 1.82 steals per game.

Coaching career

NCAA
After retiring from the NBA in 1984, Jordan was a volunteer assistant at Rutgers University under his former college head coach, and his eventual Wizards' assistant, Tom Young. Jordan followed Young to Old Dominion University as a part-time assistant as before and subsequently obtained an assistant coaching position at Boston College under Jim O'Brien in 1986. He also became an assistant coach at Rutgers in 1988.

NBA

Kings
In 1992, Jordan became an assistant coach with the Sacramento Kings, and remained an assistant for five seasons. Jordan was promoted to head coach on March 20, 1997, during the final fifteen games of the 1996–97 regular season and remained the head coach during the 1997–98 season, during which he compiled a 33–64 record as the Kings' head coach. Jordan was fired after the 1997–98 season.

Nets
Jordan joined the New Jersey Nets coaching staff on March 17, 1999, and served as the lead assistant for four seasons. While in New Jersey, Jordan helped guide the squad to consecutive Atlantic Division and Eastern Conference Championships in 2002 and 2003.

Wizards

2003–06
Later that year, Jordan signed a four-year contract worth a little more than $3 million per year with the Washington Wizards and was introduced as head coach of the team on June 19, 2003.

Washington finished with a 25–57 record during Jordan's inaugural season as head coach. The following year, Jordan helped guide the Wizards to a 20-game improvement in 2004–05. Only the Chicago Bulls and Phoenix Suns experienced a greater improvement in total wins from the previous year.

On April 11, 2005, Jordan won his 100th career game as a head coach, and improved his career record to 103–158. During the 2004–05 regular season, Jordan's second with the Wizards, he led the team to a 45–37 record, which was the franchise's best season since 1978–79. The record established a new record for wins in a season at Verizon Center, earned the team a five seed in the Eastern Conference, and was the Wizards' first playoff berth since the 1996–97 season. The Wizards played the fourth seeded Chicago Bulls and won the series four games to two. The team rallied from a 0–2 deficit to win the series with four consecutive wins. It was the team's first postseason series win since 1982.

2006–07
In the 2006–07 season, Jordan guided the Wizards to a third straight playoff berth for the first time since 1988. Jordan won the Coach of the Month award for December, guiding Washington to a 12–4 record during that month. Jordan coached the Eastern Conference All-Stars at the NBA All-Star Game on February 18 in Las Vegas, the first coach from the franchise since Dick Motta in 1978–79.

2007–08
In the 2007–08 season Jordan led the Wizards to a fourth straight playoff berth despite beginning the year 0–5. The Wizards were eliminated in the first round by the Cleveland Cavaliers for the third straight year.

Jordan was fired as head coach of the Washington Wizards on November 24, 2008, after a 1–10 start. At the time of his firing Jordan was the longest tenured coach in the Eastern Conference and as their coach he guided the Wizards to four straight playoff appearances, advancing only once. He compiled a regular season record of 197–224. The 197 victories rank third all-time in franchise history.

Sixers

2009–2010
Jordan was officially introduced as the head coach of the Philadelphia 76ers on June 1, 2009.

On Thursday, April 15, Jordan was fired by the 76ers after one season.  Later that month, it was reported that Jordan had been one of the leading candidates for the head coaching vacancy at his alma mater, Rutgers, but had pulled out of the running to continue to seek a new coaching job in the NBA.

Lakers
In 2012, Jordan was hired as an assistant coach with the Los Angeles Lakers. Jordan was brought in primarily to assist head coach Mike Brown in installing the Princeton offense.

Rutgers
On April 18, 2013, it was reported that Rutgers would name Jordan head coach, replacing fired head coach Mike Rice. On April 23, 2013, Rutgers officially announced the hiring of Eddie Jordan as the 18th head coach of the men's basketball program.

In three years as coach of the Scarlet Knights, which included their transition from the American Athletic Conference to the Big Ten Conference, Jordan finished each season with twenty or more losses and the 2015–16 season was the worst of the three. Rutgers finished with twenty-five losses, sixteen of which were in conference; a victory against Minnesota in their final regular season game prevented the Scarlet Knights from finishing winless in Big Ten play and broke a thirty-two game conference losing streak. Jordan's final game was on March 9, 2016, as the Scarlet Knights lost to Nebraska in the opening round of the Big Ten tournament; Rutgers announced his firing the next day. His overall record was 29–68, with an 8–46 record on conference play.

Head coaching record

NBA

|- 
| align="left" |Sacramento
| align="left" |
|15||6||9||.400|| align="center" |6th in Pacific||—||—||—||—
| align="center" |Missed Playoffs
|-
| align="left" |Sacramento
| align="left" |
|82||27||55||.329|| align="center" |5th in Pacific||—||—||—||—
| align="center" |Missed Playoffs
|- 
| align="left" |Washington
| align="left" |
|82||25||57||.305|| align="center" |6th in Atlantic||—||—||—||—
| align="center" |Missed Playoffs
|- 
| align="left" |Washington
| align="left" |
|82||45||37||.549|| align="center" |2nd in Southeast||10||4||6||.400
| align="center" |Lost in Conf. Semifinals
|- 
| align="left" |Washington
| align="left" |
|82||42||40||.512|| align="center" |2nd in Southeast||6||2||4||.333
| align="center" |Lost in First Round
|- 
| align="left" |Washington
| align="left" |
|82||41||41||.500|| align="center" |2nd in Southeast||4||0||4||.000
| align="center" |Lost in First Round
|- 
| align="left" |Washington
| align="left" |
|82||43||39||.524|| align="center" |2nd in Southeast||6||2||4||.333
| align="center" |Lost in First Round
|- 
| align="left" |Washington
| align="left" |
|11||1||10||.091|| align="center" |(fired)||—||—||—||—
| align="center" |—
|-
| align="left" |Philadelphia
| align="left" |
|82||27||55||.329|| align="center" |4th in Atlantic||—||—||—||—
| align="center" |Missed Playoffs
|-class="sortbottom"
| align="left" |Career
| ||600||257||343||.428|| ||26||8||18||.308

College

See also
List of National Basketball Association players with most steals in a game

References

External links
  Basketball-Reference.com player profile
  Basketball-Reference.com coaching profile

1955 births
Living people
African-American basketball coaches
African-American basketball players
American men's basketball coaches
American men's basketball players
Basketball coaches from Washington, D.C.
Basketball players from Washington, D.C.
Boston College Eagles men's basketball coaches
Charlotte Hornets assistant coaches
Cleveland Cavaliers draft picks
Cleveland Cavaliers players
Los Angeles Lakers assistant coaches
Los Angeles Lakers players
New Jersey Nets assistant coaches
New Jersey Nets players
Old Dominion Monarchs men's basketball coaches
Philadelphia 76ers head coaches
Point guards
Portland Trail Blazers players
Rutgers Scarlet Knights men's basketball coaches
Rutgers Scarlet Knights men's basketball players
Sacramento Kings assistant coaches
Sacramento Kings head coaches
Shooting guards
United States Basketball League players
Washington Wizards head coaches
Wyoming Wildcatters players
Archbishop Carroll High School (Washington, D.C.) alumni
21st-century African-American people
20th-century African-American sportspeople